Amy Paulette "Amii" Stewart (born January 29, 1956) is an American disco and soul singer and dancer who found prominence with her 1979 U.S. Billboard number 1 hit cover of Eddie Floyd's song "Knock on Wood", often considered a classic of the disco genre. Stewart scored further international hits including "Light My Fire" (1979) and "Friends" (1985). Stewart is the stepsister of actress-singer Miquel Brown and aunt to Brown's actress-singer daughter Sinitta.

Career
Amy Stewart, the fifth of six children, was born into "a big, [strictly Catholic, but] fun loving, country style family... as my mum was one of thirteen children". Her father, Joseph Stewart II, signed her up for singing and dancing lessons in 1960, when she was four years old. An Amy Stewart was already registered with the Actors' Equity Association, so she changed the spelling of her first name to Amii. She briefly enrolled in the Howard University in Washington but soon left for the Classical Repertory Dance Ensemble (CRDE) to study ballet and modern dance.

In 1975, prior to her signing a contract at Ariola Records, Stewart worked at the touring company for the stage production of the musical revue Bubbling Brown Sugar, relocating to places of production, like Miami, then New York city's Broadway and eventually London's West End, where she met Barry Leng, songwriter and record producer for Hansa Records.

The song "You Really Touched My Heart", a Leng/Simon May composition and produced by Leng, was Stewart's first recording, published by the end of 1977. An album followed, released in February 1979, which contained five Leng/May songs, one Leng/Morris song and three cover versions. The album yielded the single releases "Knock on Wood" and "Light My Fire/137 Disco Heaven".

Stewart's first single release, a Disco cover version of the 1966 Eddie Floyd composition "Knock on Wood", reached number one of the U.S. Billboard single charts in April 1979 and earned her a platinum record and a Grammy Award nomination. It also ranked high in the single charts throughout Europe and reached #6 in the UK and #2 in Australia. Another single, a medley cover song of the Doors classic "Light My Fire" and "137 Disco Heaven", entitled "Light My Fire/137 Disco Heaven" was released in the same year, entering the charts and reached #5 in the UK, #14 in Australia and #69 in the US.

New Trends

By the end of the decade, disco music had, to a great extent, reached its technical limits, and growing anti-disco sentiment eventually affected the US Music community. A new generation of musicians and fans, tending to idealise authenticity and purity, rejected disco as artificial, mindless and consumerist. The media, industry and markets, always intent on re-invention, were abandoning disco and feverishly scouting for new trends. 

Generally moderate US interest in Stewart's Paradise Bird album, released in September 1979, came as no surprise. However, success and media feedback in Europe was unchanged. Europe's music industry and scene was the sum of many small and diverse parts. New ideas would certainly be adopted but old ones preserved. Not declaring disco dead, the UK, for example, was left with a somewhat controverse culture, that fed cynicism. "The rest was a mess", where punk rock and Diana Ross co-existed. Paradise Bird yielded two European single releases, "Jealousy" (#58 UK, #4 Italy, #5 Switzerland) and the double A-side "The Letter/Paradise Bird" (#39 UK 1980). Stewart, however, remained confident about her career. She told her production team and record label to be "changing styles slowly, so as not get caught in the shuffle". The source of inspiration would be her artistic background in theater, modern dance and melodic music.

Following her success in Europe, Stewart relocated to Italy in the mid-1980s. and released the recordings "Friends" and "Together", produced in collaboration with Italian composer/musician Mike Francis. "Friends" was a big hit in the UK, Italy and the Philippines.

Later career

In the 1998 movie 54, actress/singer Mary Griffin portrayed Stewart, performing the song "Knock on Wood", at the famed discothèque Studio 54 in New York City. While performing, Griffin wore an apparently very similar extravagant outfit (and particularly the headgear) to that which Stewart wore in the official video to "Knock on Wood" in 1979. Although it was obvious that Griffin was portraying Stewart, the credits at the end of the movie have Griffin's character listed as Disco Star.

In 2000, Stewart toured Italy, playing the part of Mary Magdalene, in a revival of the rock opera Jesus Christ Superstar. The play also starred Carl Anderson, who revived his role of Judas Iscariot from the 1973 movie.

In 2004, Stewart published the studio album Lady Day, that contains sixteen cast recordings of the 2003 musical Lady Day, produced and oo-written by Stewart and Theater director Massimo Romeo Piparo. Based on the life of American Jazz and Blues singer Billie Holiday, Stewart starring as Billie Holiday herself, states: "The idea for the musical was born from my passion for the wonderful voice of the 'Queen of Swing', but also for the music of the 1930s and 1940s and for the black renaissance of the time, of which she was the protagonist." and further: "In that period of racism the foundations were laid for the rebirth not only of Blacks, but also of world music."

Since 2001, Stewart has been working as a goodwill ambassador for Unicef Italia and has been involved in numerous projects such as "Uniti per i bambini, Uniti contro l'AIDS" ("United for the children, united against AIDS"). In 2006, she recorded the charity single "Love Song" for UNICEF in four different languages, once again returning to work with Ennio Morricone. The following year saw her return to duet with Mike Francis on the track "Nothing Can Come Between Us". In 2006, Stewart and long-time friend and collaborator Ennio Morricone released the 5 track single "Love Song", sung in English, Italian, French, Spanish as well as a multilingual version. All proceeds from the single went to Unicef's campaign "Check Out For Children".

In May 2007, Stewart again participated in the Sanremo Music Festival, performing the duet "Schiavo D'Amore" with Piero Mazzocchetti.

In 2014, she took part in the prime-time Rai TV show La Pista as teamleader of the "Virality" dance troupe. Stewart and the dance team became the overall competition winners. Other well known singer-contestants included Tony Hadley and Sabrina Salerno.

Stewart has been greatly affected by Italy, and living in Rome since the mid-1980s, has become fluent in Italian. UNICEF Italia introduces her in a mutually cordial tone, pointing out: "The one between Amii Stewart and Italy is a beautiful love story." And that she "has been 'adopted' by our country and has certainly returned the affection received".

Discography

 Knock on Wood (1979)
 Paradise Bird (1979)
 Images (1981) (released in North America as I'm Gonna Get Your Love)
Amii Stewart (1983)
 Try Love (1984)
 Amii (1986)
 Time for Fantasy (1988)
 Pearls – Amii Stewart Sings Ennio Morricone (1990)
 Magic (1992)
 Lady to Ladies (1994)
 The Men I Love (1995)
 Love Affair (1996)
 Unstoppable (1999)
 Lady Day (2004)
 Caracciolo Street (2010)
 Intense (2012)

References

Sources and external links
 Official site for Amii Stewart
 Discogs.com discography
 
 Rate Your Music biography and discography
 Disco Profiles biography and discography
 Unicef Italy biography

1956 births
Living people
African-American women singers
American women pop singers
American disco musicians
American dance musicians
American expatriates in Italy
American soul singers
Singers from Washington, D.C.
Ariola Records artists
UNICEF Goodwill Ambassadors
American emigrants to Italy
American disco singers
Hansa Records artists
RCA Records artists